The 2022 ELF season was the second season of the European League of Football, a semi professional American football league based in Europe. Twelve teams from five different countries participated. The 2022 season started on June 4, 2022, and concluded with the Championship Game on September 25, 2022 at the Wörthersee Stadion, Klagenfurt.

Format 
The league is divided into three conferences, North, Central and South. Each team plays 12 games during the regular season: twice against their conference rivals, and twice against three of the teams from the other conferences. The top team in each conference, as well as the best second-place team, qualify for the playoffs.

Teams 
On top of the eight inaugural season teams, the league expanded with four new franchises. On September 25, 2021, the Vienna Vikings, Raiders Tirol as well as Rhein Fire were officially introduced as new teams. On October 15, 2021 the addition of the Istanbul Rams was announced. First, the Rams home field was the Yusuf Ziya Öniş Stadium but was later changed.

Rosters  
Like last season, there is a limit of 4 US American, Canadian, Mexican or Japanese players per roster, and two on the field at the same time, but people who are dual citizens of the U.S. and a EU-member country are not counted towards that limit in keeping with the Bosman ruling. There is also a limit of 8 non-American foreigners per roster. Brazilian players do not count towards the import quota.
The overall roster limit is 55 active Players and 5 spots on the practice squad.

Roster moves
In the 2022 preseason, several ELF players were picked up by other professional leagues, including 2021 season MVP Madre London. ELF contracts allow for premature termination in case professional North American leagues want to sign these players.

 NFL IPP Program: Marcel Dabo (Stuttgart Surge), Adedayo Odeleye (Berlin Thunder) 
 Canadian Football League: Keanu Ebanks (Panthers Wrocław), Seantavius Jones (Berlin Thunder), Anthony Mahoungou (Frankfurt Galaxy) 
 United States Football League: Madre London (Cologne Centurions), Kolin Hill (Berlin Thunder), Dartez Jacobs (Raiders Tirol), Diondre Overton (Vienna Vikings), KaVontae Turpin (Panthers Wrocław), Dale Warren (Stuttgart Surge)

Player representation
After players complained of subpar housing conditions for "import" players of the  Frankfurt Galaxy franchise, an unofficial union, based in  Switzerland was formed under the name of European League of Football Players Association (ELFPA). Representatives of this union are not public and concrete measures haven't been taken so far.

In order to represent active players of the ELF, the league announced the Players Committee for the 2022 season. It consists of two players of each franchise and can hold regular meetings. Out of this committee two spokespersons are elected which are in contact with the commissioner and the Competition Committee of the league.

Rule changes 
After the inaugural season, in which the ELF mostly used modified NFL rules (with the exception of the overtime rule, which was based on that of college football – but never used during the entire season as no overtime needed to be played), the league announced its first rule change for the second season. The kick-off rule has been modified to increase player safety, and has been taken from the second iteration of the XFL. According to the new rule, teams will now face each other 5 yards apart, and can only start moving after the returner catches the kickoff, or 3 seconds after the ball hits the ground.

After making its ELF debut in the 2021 championship game, Instant Replay will be used for the entirety of the 2022 season. Like in the NFL, every coach has two challenges per game, with the possibility of a third if both of the challenges are successful.

All teams are not allowed to start organised team activities before May 1, 2022 with import players and padded training. The league set this rule to ensure competitive balance, in which teams with more funds can pay their import players earlier. Strength and conditioning sessions and individual training are not affected by this rule.

Regular season

Schedule 
The schedule for the 2022 season was released on February 14, 2022. For international matches of the IFAF the league has agreed to plan for a break.

Week 1

Week 2

Week 3

Week 4

Week 5

Week 6

Week 7

Week 8

Week 9

Week 10

Week 11

Week 12

Week 13

Week 14

Standings 

In case ties inside and between the conferences have to be broken, the rules are:

 Number of wins
 Head-to-head matchup
 Points difference in head-to-head matchups
 Points scored at away games of head-to-head matchups
 Total points difference
 Total points scored
 Point scored at away games
 Coin toss performed by the Commissioner or a person (e.g., a prominent sportsmen) determined by the Commissioner

This is notably different from tiebreakers used in the NFL which take strength of schedule into account or the German Football League which values the head-to-head as the first tiebreaker for teams with the same win–loss record, in part to discourage running up the score.

Play-offs 
The semifinals will be played on September 10 and 11, 2022, and the final will be held on September 25, in Klagenfurt, Austria.

Divisional playoffs

Hamburg Sea Devils 19, Raiders Tirol 7

Barcelona Dragons 12, Vienna Vikings 39

Championship Game 
The Vikings won the title in their first season. The Sea Devils had to accept the second defeat in the championship game in the second season. The Championship MVP trophy was won by Kimi Linnainmaa, the Finish WR of the Vikings, who caught 7 passes for 125 yards, and threw the TD pass to the first lead.

Vienna Vikings 27, Hamburg Sea Devils 15

Attendance

Awards

MVP of the Week

Statistical leaders

Broadcasting 
Selected games of this season are available in free TV of most of the participating countries. For the Austrian and vGerman market, the league's main broadcasting partner is ProSiebenSat.1 Media. All games of the Raiders Tirol and the Vienna Vikings as well as the final in Klagenfurt are broadcast over the Puls 4 network with its sister channel Puls 24 and video-on-demand via Zapppn. 
In Germany ProSieben MAXX and their online-streaming service ran.de airing games on Saturday and Sunday. 
Furthermore the league-owned service More Than Sports TV, which is available over platforms like Zattoo, will show games in Austria, Germany and Switzerland as well as Esport3 in Catalonia, S Sport in Turkey, Polsat Sport in Poland and LIVENow for international streaming. All games are also available worldwide on ELF Gamepass.

All Stars

First Team

Second Team

Signees to other professional leagues 
The following players invited to the NFL’s International Combine, assigned to NFL's International Player Pathway Program (IPPP), signed or drafted by CFL team or signed with USFL or XFL team following their involvement with the ELF in 2022:

NFL

CFL 
The following players signed with a CFL team:

XFL

USFL

Notes

References

External links 
 Official website of the European League of Football

European League of Football
ELF
European League of Football seasons